Azucena is a feminine given name. Notable people with the name include:

Azucena Arbeleche (born 1970), Uruguayan economist, professor, and civil servant
Azucena Berruti (born 1929), Uruguayan politician
Azucena Grajo Uranza (1929–1912), Filipino novelist
Azucena Villaflor (1924–1977), Argentine social activist

Fictional characters
Azucena (gypsy), a character in the opera Il Trovatore

Feminine given names